Uniontown USD 235 is a public unified school district headquartered in Uniontown, Kansas, United States.  The district includes the communities of  Uniontown, Bronson, Hiattville, Mapleton, Redfield, and nearby rural areas.

Schools
The school district operates the following schools:
 Uniontown High School
 Uniontown Junior High School
 West Bourbon Elementary School

See also
 Kansas State Department of Education
 Kansas State High School Activities Association
 List of high schools in Kansas
 List of unified school districts in Kansas

References

External links
 

School districts in Kansas
Education in Bourbon County, Kansas